This is a list of deputies elected to the Syrian parliament of 2016-2020. The Syrian parliamentary election was held on 13 April 2016.

Members

Damascus Province
Damascus Province was allocated 29 seats:

Rif Dimashq Governorate
Rif Dimashq was allocated 19 seats:

Daraa Province
Daraa Province was allocated 10 seats:

As-Suwayda Governorate
As-Suwayda Governorate was allocated 6 seats:

Homs Province
Homs Province was allocated 23 seats:

Hama Province
Hama Province was allocated 22 seats:

Hasakah Province
Hasakah Province was allocated 14 seats:

Deir ez-Zor Province
Deir ez-Zor was allocated 13 seats:

Raqqa Province
Raqqa Governorate was allocated 8 seats:

Aleppo Province
Aleppo Province was allocated 32 seats:

Aleppo City
Aleppo was allocated 21 seats:

Idlib Province
Idlib Province was allocated 18 seats:

Latakia Province
Latakia Province was allocated 17 seats:

Tartus Province
Tartus Governorate was allocated 13 seats:

Quneitra Province
Quneitra Governorate was allocated 5 seats:

See also
Parliament of Syria
Elections in Syria
Politics of Syria

References

 1961
Parliament, members, 1961
 Parl